Ring of Scorpio is a 1990 Australian TV miniseries. It was made with assistance from the Film Finance Corporation Australia, BBC Television, and the Nine Network.  It was shot in Morocco, Spain, Sydney, and Broken Hill.

References

External links

English-language television shows
1990s Australian television miniseries
1990 Australian television series debuts
1990 Australian television series endings
1990 television films
1990 films